Cheonan National Technical College was a public vocational college located in Cheonan City, South Chungcheong province, South Korea. The school was amalgamated with Kongju National University in 2005 and exists today as Kongju National University's Cheonan campus.

Academics

Academic offerings are largely in industrial and technical fields.  The various departments are divided into three divisions:  Machinery, Electricity and Electronic Communications, and Materials and Environmental Design.  In addition, the department of liberal arts is not affiliated with any division.

History

The school opened in 1973 as Cheonan Industrial Technical School (천안공업전문학교).  It was brought under national jurisdiction in 1982.

Sister schools

Ties exist with schools in Japan (Nagano Technical Junior College), Taiwan (National Formosa University), Australia (University of Newcastle) and America (Bemidji State University).

See also
Education in South Korea
List of colleges and universities in South Korea

External links
Official school website

Vocational education in South Korea
Universities and colleges in South Chungcheong Province
Cheonan
Educational institutions established in 1973
1973 establishments in South Korea

Defunct universities and colleges in South Korea